Richard D. Finn, Jr. (born c. 1933), also known as Dick Finn, was an American baseball player and coach. He grew up in Lima, Ohio, and attended Ohio State University. He was a pitcher for the Ohio State Buckeyes baseball team and captain of the 1955 team that won a Big Ten Conference championship in 1955.  He graduated from Ohio State in 1955. From 1960 to 1964, he was an assistant football and basketball coach at Woodward High School in Toledo, Ohio.  In August 1964, he was hired as the head baseball coach at the University of Toledo. He held that position for until 1969.  In September 1969 he was hired as an assistant baseball coach at Ohio State. In May 1975, after six years as an assistant coach, he became the head baseball coach at Ohio State. He stepped down as head baseball coach in June 1987 and was appointed special assistant to Ohio State athletic director Rick Bay.

References

Year of birth missing (living people)
1930s births
Living people
Baseball pitchers
Ohio State Buckeyes baseball coaches
Ohio State Buckeyes baseball players
Toledo Rockets baseball coaches
High school baseball coaches in the United States
High school football coaches in Ohio
Sportspeople from Lima, Ohio
Baseball players from Ohio